iStreamPlanet is a Seattle, Washington-based company which processes and delivers live video broadcasts over the internet. A majority stake of iStreamPlanet was acquired by Turner Broadcasting in 2015 and is currently operated by Warner Bros. Discovery. The company was founded in 2000 by former basketball player Mio Babic.

iStreamPlanet has streamed a number of major sporting events, including every NCAA Division I men's basketball tournament since 2017, every Olympics since 2010, the Super Bowl, the FIFA World Cup, and Formula One auto racing.

Customers
While not all of iStreamPlanet's live video streaming customers are publicly known, some of their large customers are publicly acknowledged, including:
 WarnerMedia (including streaming of March Madness and B/R Live)
 NBC Sports (including streaming of the 2010, 2012, 2014, 2016, 2018, 2020, and 2022 Olympics)
 Hulu
 FuboTV
 Spark Sport

References

External links
 

Online mass media companies of the United States
Warner Bros. Discovery subsidiaries
Streaming software
Streaming media systems
Media servers
Former AT&T subsidiaries